Woodward Island is an island in the Sacramento-San Joaquin River Delta, twenty kilometres east of Antioch, and twenty kilometres west of Stockton.  The  island is bounded on the west by Old River, on the north by Bacon Island, on the east by Middle River, and Woodward Canal on the south. It is in San Joaquin County, and managed by Reclamation District 2072. It appears on 1913 and 1952 United States Geological Survey maps of the area.

See also
List of islands of California

References

Islands of the Sacramento–San Joaquin River Delta
Islands of Northern California
Islands of San Joaquin County, California
Islands of California